Mark Christopher Blackhall (born 17 November 1960 in Upney, Essex) is an English former footballer who played as a striker, mainly for Orient.

Blackhall was a product of Orient's youth system, and made his first team debut as a substitute in the 1981–82 FA Cup third round victory over Charlton Athletic on 2 January 1982. After making three league appearances as a substitute, his first senior start came in the 3–0 victory over Leicester City on 18 May 1982.

He featured occasionally for Orient during the following season, and scored his only goal for the club, a diving header, in the 5–2 defeat at Brentford on 22 January 1983. He also appeared in the 1–0 defeat at Newport County in the second round of the 1982–83 FA Cup, both legs of the 3–2 aggregate defeat to Gillingham in the first round of the League Cup that season, and all three of Orient's matches in the Football League Trophy. Although Blackhall was never a first team regular, Orient manager Ken Knighton praised him for his attitude in training.

Later that year, he moved into non-league football with Chelmsford City, and later owned a nightclub in Southend-on-Sea.

Statistics

References

1960 births
English footballers
Association football forwards
Leyton Orient F.C. players
Chelmsford City F.C. players
Living people